Xylocoremium is a fungal genus in the family Xylariaceae. The monotypic genus was circumscribed in 1984.

References

External links

Fungi of North America
Monotypic Ascomycota genera
Xylariales